Come Dine With Me South Africa is a television series that made its debut on BBC Entertainment in South Africa in October 2011. The series is produced by Rapid Blue, proved to be a success attracting over 100,000 viewers per premiere episode and reaching more than 2.5 million DStv viewers overall.

Come Dine With Me South Africa follows four strangers as they visit one another’s homes for dinner and attempt to outwit and impress fellow guests with their culinary and hospitality skills in a bid to win a cash prize and Pick n Pay vouchers. Episode 1 of the first series kicked off with two ladies from the South East of Johannesburg, Estie Matheus and Michelle Jordan, jointly winning and having to share the prizes and concluded with a celebrity special featuring M-Net presenter Ashley Hayden, SuperSport’s Neil Andrews, 94.7 Highveld Stereo’s Sam Cowen and model Shashi Naidoo.

Come Dine With Me is an ITV Studios format. Distributed by ITV Studios Global Entertainment, it is produced in 36 territories internationally including Germany, France and Australia. The show won a South African Film and Television Award in 2011.

The show was cancelled in April 2014. The show then returned to BBC Brit for a fourth season in 2018.

References

External links 
 

South African reality television series
Come Dine With Me
South African television series based on British television series